John Meredith Bass (January 19, 1804– March 14, 1878) was an American banker, planter and Whig politician. He served as the Mayor of Nashville, Tennessee from 1833 to 1834, and again in 1869.

Early life
John Meredith Bass was born on January 19, 1804, in Nashville, Tennessee. His father, Peter Bass, was a real estate investor in Nashville. His mother was from Kentucky.

Bass was educated in Kentucky. He graduated from the University of Nashville, and earned a law degree from Transylvania University. He was "admitted to the bar in 1830."

Career
Bass served on the board of aldermen of Nashville from 1831 to 1832, and as the mayor of Nashville in 1833 as a Whig. Additionally, he was "one of the commissioners who built the Nashville water-works."

Bass became the president of the Union Bank of Tennessee in 1837. He was also the founding president of the Southern Life Insurance Company. Additionally, he was the owner of plantations in Louisiana and Arkansas.

Bass served on the board of trustees of the Nashville Female Academy (also known as the Old Academy), and the University of Nashville. In 1869, Bass served as the "receiver" of Nashville, for which he gave a $1 million bond.

Personal life and death
On January 7, 1829, Bass married Malvina Grundy, daughter of Senator Felix Grundy, after she eloped at the age of eighteen. He was a personal friend of slave trader John Armfield. Like him, he owned a cottage in Beersheba Springs, Tennessee.

Bass died on March 14, 1878, in New Orleans, where he was visiting his daughter. He was buried with his wife in the Mount Olivet Cemetery in Nashville.

References

1804 births
1878 deaths
University of Nashville alumni
Transylvania University alumni
Tennessee city council members
Mayors of Nashville, Tennessee
American bankers
Businesspeople from Tennessee
American businesspeople in insurance
American planters
Tennessee Whigs
19th-century American politicians
Burials at Mount Olivet Cemetery (Nashville)
American slave owners